Namaland was a Bantustan in South West Africa (present-day Namibia), intended by the apartheid government to be a self-governing homeland for the Nama people. A centrally administered local government was created in 1980.

The term Namaland also covers a much broader region of southern Namibia which is the traditional home of the northern Nama or Namaqua people. Their language, Nama, is the only surviving dialect of the Khoekhoe language. The suffix -qua means “people” and can be added to the names of most Khoekhoe groups. The region of the Northern Cape south of the Orange River is called Namaqualand.

Background

In the 1960s South Africa, which was administering South West Africa under a League of Nations mandate, came under increased international pressure regarding its minority White rule over the majority of Blacks. The solution envisaged by South Africa—the Odendaal Plan—was to separate the white and the non-white population, grant self-government to the isolated black territories, and thus make Whites the majority population in the vast remainder of the country. Moreover it was envisaged that by separating each ethnic group and confining people by law to their restricted areas, discrimination by race would automatically disappear.

The demarcated territories were called the bantustans, and the remainder of the land was called the Police Zone. Forthwith, all non-white people employed in the Police Zone became migrant workers, and pass laws were established to police movement in and out of the bantustans.

The combined territory of all bantustans was roughly equal in size to the Police Zone. However, all bantustans were predominantly rural and excluded major towns. All harbours, most of the railway network and the tarred road infrastructure, all larger airports, the profitable diamond areas and the national parks were situated in the Police Zone.

Establishment
For Southern Namibia the Odendaal Plan designated Namaland from four already existing native reserves, Berseba, Tses, the Krantzplatz reserve near Gibeon and the Soromas reserve near Bethanie, plus 165 white-owned farms. Generous offers from the administration to buy these farms from the White settlers lead to many voluntary sales but also raised farm prices in the Police Zone. The townlands of Gibeon were added, and formed the administrative capital of the bantustan. This territory excluded the former Bondels Nama reserve, comprising   around Warmbad. Its Nama inhabitants were to relocate to the new reserve.

Namaland, like other homelands in South West Africa, was abolished in May 1989 at the start of the transition to independence.

See also
Apartheid
Leaders of Namaland

References

History of Namibia
Bantustans in South West Africa
States and territories established in 1980
States and territories disestablished in 1989
Enclaves and exclaves
Nama people